Fifteen ships of the Royal Navy have been named HMS Chatham after the port of Chatham, Kent, home of the Chatham Dockyard.

  was a galliot captured in 1666 during the Second Anglo-Dutch War and given away in 1667.
  was a 4-gun sloop launched in 1673 and wrecked in 1677.
  was a fourth rate launched in 1691 and sunk as a breakwater at Sheerness in 1749.  She was raised and broken up in 1762.
  was a 4-gun yacht launched in 1716 and sold in 1742.
  was a 6-gun yacht launched in 1741. She was rebuilt in 1793 and 1842, and broken up by 1867.
  was a 50-gun fourth rate launched in 1758. She was used for harbour service from 1793 and was a powder hulk from 1805.  She was renamed HMS Tilbury in 1810 and was broken up in 1814.
  was a 4-gun survey brig, launched in 1788.  She was part of George Vancouver's expedition of the Pacific Northwest coast and circumnavigated the globe.  She was sold in 1830.
  was a 4-gun schooner purchased in 1790 and sold in 1794.
  was a hired sloop in service in 1793.
  was a transport launched in 1811 and sunk as a breakwater in 1825.
  was a 74-gun third rate, originally the French Royal Hollandais. She was captured on the stocks in 1809 at Flushing, launched in 1812, and sold in 1817.
  was a sheer hulk launched in 1813 and broken up in 1876.
  was an iron paddlewheel gunboat launched in 1835. She was subsequently exported to the United States and became a blockade runner for the Confederate Navy during the American Civil War. She served with the US Navy until 1865.
  was a  light cruiser launched in 1911. She was lent to the Royal New Zealand Navy in 1920 and was scrapped in 1926.
  was a Type 22 frigate. She was launched in 1988 and decommissioned in February 2011.

See also

References
 

Royal Navy ship names